KNSN (1240 kHz) is an AM radio station licensed to San Diego, California, United States. The station is owned by  Crawford Broadcasting, through licensee Kiertron, Inc.  It airs a brokered Christian radio format, mostly simulcast with co-owned KBRT (740 AM) in Costa Mesa.  Programs include half-hour weekday shows from Charles Stanley, Joyce Meyer and David Jeremiah.  Studios for KBRT and KNSN are on Airway Avenue in Costa Mesa.

KNSN transmits with a power of 550 watts, day and night, with its transmitter off Newton Avenue in San Diego, at the intersection of Route 15 and Interstate 5. KNSN shares the tower with KURS (1040 AM).  Programming on KNSN is also heard on 15-watt FM translator station K277DG at 103.3 MHz in San Diego.

History

The station signed on in 1947 as KSON.  
KSON used a 250-watt RCA transmitter with a tower that was 250 feet tall. The station was owned and operated by Fred Rebal.

Through the 1960s, 1970s and 1980s, KSON was a country music station, mostly simulcast with KSON-FM (97.3 FM, now on 103.7 FM). In 1985, KSON-AM-FM were acquired by Jefferson Pilot Broadcasting.  On July 24, 1996, the AM station's format was changed to children's radio as KDDZ, with the call sign standing for "Kids."  It started as a KidStar Radio Network affiliate; that network was short-lived and merged with Radio Disney.

During a heavy rain and wind storm near the end of December 2004, approximately half of the radio antenna tower collapsed and fell, leaving the tower at a height of about 200 feet. It had been 442 feet tall.

Later, KNSN was a gospel music radio station, having that format from January 2007 until July 2007. The station was sold to Multicultural Broadcasting Inc., owned by Arthur Liu, on June 1, 2009.  In the early 2000s, it shifted to a Spanish-language Christian radio format.

On May 22, 2014, Crawford Broadcasting announced it would acquire KNSN for $1.5 million through licensee Kiertron, Inc. The sale was consummated on July 25, 2014, with the Spanish 
Christian programming shifting to 1040 KURS.  KNSN went silent in late July 2014 in preparation for a new format under Crawford Broadcasting ownership.  KNSN returned to air on September 29, 2014. The format ended up being the previous religious format, this time in English. It is mostly a simulcast of co-owned KBRT in Costa Mesa.

In 2017, a 15-watt FM translator station was added, 103.3 MHz K277DG. It shares the same broadcast tower as the AM signal. The translator is often cut off as distant station KRUZ in Santa Barbara, the dominant station at 103.3, often hashes out K277DG's signal in tropospheric ducting.

References

External links
FCC History Cards for KNSN
K-Brite
The Soul of San Diego (website of previous gospel format)

Radio stations established in 1947
1947 establishments in California
NSN